The Kwa languages, often specified as New Kwa, are a proposed but as-yet-undemonstrated family of languages spoken in the south-eastern part of Ivory Coast, across southern Ghana, and in central Togo. The name was introduced 1895 by Gottlob Krause and derives from the word for 'people' (Kwa) in many of these languages, as illustrated by Akan names.

Languages
See the box at right for a current classification.

The various clusters of languages included in Kwa are at best distantly related, and it has not been demonstrated that they are closer to each other than to neighboring Niger–Congo languages.

Stewart distinguished the following major branches, which historical-comparative analysis supports as valid groups:
Potou–Tano (including Akan)
Ga–Dangme
Na-Togo
[formerly] Gbe (inclusion doubtful, as they show more features of Kwa the closer one moves to Akan)
The Lagoon languages of southern Ivory Coast are not particularly close to any of these, nor to each other, so they are left ungrouped: 
Avikam–Alladian
Attié
Abé
Adjukru
Abidji
[dubious] Ega
An Esuma language, extinct ca. 1800, remains unclassified.

Since Stewart, Ega has been tentatively removed, the Gbe languages reassigned to Volta–Niger, and Apro added. Some of the Na-Togo and Ka-Togo languages have been placed into separate branches of Kwa. See the infobox at right for the resulting branches.

Ethnologue divides the Kwa languages into two broad geographical groupings: Nyo and Left bank, but this is not a genealogical classification. The Nyo group collapses Stewart's Potou–Tano and Ga–Dangme branches and also includes the ungrouped languages of southern Ivory Coast, while the Ka/Na-Togo and Gbe languages are called Left bank because they are spoken to the east of the Volta River.

History of the proposal
The word 'Kwa' was used by Gottlob Krause in 1885 for the Akan (or perhaps Tano), Gã, and Gbe languages, which have kwa or kua as their word for 'human being'. Since then the proposal has been dramatically expanded, only to revert to something approaching its initial conception.

In 1952 Westermann and Bryan expanded Kwa to the various Lagoon languages of southern Ivory Coast and to what are now called the Volta–Niger languages of southern Nigeria. Greenberg (1963) added the Kru languages of Liberia, the Ghana–Togo Mountain languages which Westermann and Bryan had specifically excluded, and Ijaw of the Niger delta; West Kwa included the languages from Liberia to Dahomey (Republic of Benin), and East Kwa the languages of Nigeria. Bennett & Sterk (1977) proposed that the Yoruboid and Igboid languages belonged in Benue–Congo rather than in Kwa. Stewart (1989) removed Kru, Ijaw, and Volta–Niger (East Kwa), but kept the Ghana–Togo Mountain and Lagoon languages, as well as adding a few obscure, newly described languages. Stewart's classification is the basis of more recent conceptions. To disambiguate this from Greenberg's influential classification, the reduced family is sometimes called "New Kwa".

Comparative vocabulary
Sample basic vocabulary of Kwa and related languages from Dumestre (1971) and other sources:

Numerals
Comparison of numerals in individual languages:

See also
Proto-Potou-Akanic reconstructions (Wiktionary)
Gbe languages
Kru languages
Gur languages

References

Footnotes

Notations
Bennett, Patrick R. & Sterk, Jan P. (1977) 'South Central Niger–Congo: A reclassification'. Studies in African Linguistics, 8, 241–273.
Hintze, Ursula (1959) Bibliographie der Kwa-Sprachen und der Sprachen der Togo-Restvölker (mit 11 zweifarbigen Sprachenkarten). Berlin: Akademie-Verlag.
Stewart, John M. (1989) 'Kwa'. In: Bendor-Samuel & Hartell (eds.) The Niger–Congo languages. Lanham, MD: The University Press of America.
Westermann, Diedrich Hermann (1952) Languages of West Africa (Handbook of African Languages Part II). London/New York/Toronto: Oxford University Press.
Williamson, Kay & Blench, Roger (2000) 'Niger–Congo', in Heine, Bernd and Nurse, Derek (eds) African Languages - An Introduction. Cambridge: Cambridge University press, pp. 11–42.

External links
 Journal of West African Languages: Kwa languages

Volta–Congo languages